Joe Cain (1832–1904) was a Native American.

Joe or Joseph Cain may also refer to:

Joe Cain (American football) (born 1965), American football linebacker
Joe Cain (historian of science) (born 1964)
Joe Cain (rugby union) for Leicester Tigers
Joseph Alexander Cain (1920–1980), American painter, art educator and critic
Joseph Hilliard Cain Sr. (1892–1962), American military officer and politician

See also
Joe Kane, American author
Joseph Kane (disambiguation)